Yana Sheina (born 23 June 2000) is a Russian footballer who plays as a midfielder for Lokomotiv Moscow and has appeared for the Russia women's national team.

Career
Sheina has been capped for the Russia national team, appearing for the team during the UEFA Women's Euro 2021 qualifying cycle.

References

External links
 
 

2000 births
Living people
Russian women's footballers
Russia women's international footballers
Women's association football midfielders
WFC Lokomotiv Moscow players